Mohammed Jamal Atiq Farhan Al-Falasi (Arabic:محمد جمال) (born 22 July 1989) is an Emirati footballer who plays for Al Dhaid as a midfielder.

External links

References

Emirati footballers
1989 births
Living people
Al-Wasl F.C. players
Hatta Club players
Emirates Club players
Al Dhaid SC players
UAE First Division League players
UAE Pro League players
Association football midfielders
Asian Games medalists in football
Footballers at the 2010 Asian Games
Asian Games silver medalists for the United Arab Emirates
Medalists at the 2010 Asian Games